The Kitchi Gammi Club is the oldest incorporated club in the U.S. state of Minnesota, founded in 1883.  Its historic clubhouse in Duluth, Minnesota, was built from 1912 to 1913.  In 1975 the clubhouse was listed on the National Register of Historic Places for its state-level significance in the theme of architecture.  It was nominated for its fine Georgian/Gothic Revival design by Bertram Goodhue and its superlative craftsmanship.

See also
 List of gentlemen's clubs in the United States
 National Register of Historic Places listings in St. Louis County, Minnesota

References

External links
 Kitchi Gammi Club

1883 establishments in Minnesota
Buildings and structures in Duluth, Minnesota
Clubhouses on the National Register of Historic Places in Minnesota
Cultural infrastructure completed in 1913
Gentlemen's clubs in the United States
Georgian Revival architecture in Minnesota
Gothic Revival architecture in Minnesota
National Register of Historic Places in St. Louis County, Minnesota